St George's Cathedral is the principal Anglican church in the city of Perth, Western Australia, and the mother-church of the Anglican Diocese of Perth. It is located on St Georges Terrace in the centre of the city.

On 26 June 2001 the cathedral was listed on the Western Australia Heritage Register with the following statement of significance:

History

Built between 1879 and 1888 the cathedral was situated at the corner of St Georges Terrace and Cathedral Avenue at the heart of Perth's heritage precinct, which includes the nearby Treasury Buildings and the town hall. It replaced an earlier building immediately to the north-east of the present one. The cathedral is described in the Western Australian State Heritage Register as being a church in the Victorian Academic style, built of locally made brick, limestone from Rottnest Island and Western Australian jarrah. The pitched roof was originally covered with slates; these were replaced by tiles in the 1950s because the original roof leaked, and returned to slate in the restoration works in the early 2000s as the tiles were too heavy causing the roof to bow.  A central nave, with a timber vaulted roof supported by hammerbeams, has an aisle on each side and a rose window dominating its western end. The rose-coloured brick interior of the cathedral is simple but elegant. The State Heritage Register assessment describes the intersecting beams over the crossing as "impressive in their lightness and grace" and providing a "subdued but elegant decoration to the building". The present cathedral was designed by Sydney architect Edmund Blacket, the pre-eminent architect of his age in New South Wales.

The site is near the "Rush Church", the first church built in Perth by Frederick Irwin, in December 1829, a few months after the city was founded.

From 2005 to 2008 the cathedral was extensively restored with the tile roof replaced by slates as originally built. Earthquake protection was added to two walls to provide bracing and much other work was undertaken.

St George's Cathedral has become noted for its innovative and controversial theological teaching, popular preaching, commitment to inter-faith worship and music.

The cathedral is listed on the permanent register of the Western Australia Heritage Register, is classified by the National Trust WA and is entered into the (now defunct) Register of the National Estate.

In 2018, Kay Goldsworthy became the world's first female Anglican archbishop in Perth. Her installation service was held at St George's Cathedral. She had become a bishop in St George's Cathedral in 2008.

Bells
The cathedral has a peal of eight bells set for change ringing and rung by the St George's Cathedral Bellringers' Association, affiliated with the Australian and New Zealand Association of Bellringers.

Upon hearing of Queen Victoria's death in 1901 the Perth community created an appeal to fund the creation of the Queen Victoria Memorial Bell Tower at the cathedral. The square castellated bell tower was designed by the Western Australian architect Talbot Hobbs. The red-and-white flag of Saint George is flown daily from the top of the bell tower. The bells were cast by John Warner & Sons of London and installed on the second anniversary of Victoria's death. However, the bells were only rung infrequently for the subsequent decades due to a combination of the lack of proficient ringers and for structural concerns in the tower itself. The bells were regularly rung every Sunday (but not tolled) up until the 1970s.

The castellated bell tower was damaged in the 1968 Meckering earthquake. All ringing in the tower was ceased after tower bricks were dislodged due to service ringing in July 1973. The bellringing band became active again and achieved 25 peals by the end of the 20th century.

Organs

West organ
The west organ was installed in 1993 and dedicated on Advent Sunday. It is placed on a specially constructed gallery at the west end of the cathedral. The organ and gallery together form a feature complementing the architecture of the nave and chancel.

The organ is the largest mechanical-action instrument to be installed in Western Australia since the similarly sized Ronald Sharp organ in the Perth Concert Hall was completed in 1974. The casework is made of Tasmanian oak and the front pipes are of burnished tin. The organ has 4 divisions, 48 speaking stops and 3516 pipes. Tonal revisions and refinements were carried out in 2008/09 by the South Island Organ Company (SIOC) of Timaru, New Zealand.  This included lengthening the resonators of the chorus reeds to provide a more fundamental tone quality and a thorough cleaning and regulation of the flue pipes to improve the overall quality and cohesion of the sound.

In 2010, SIOC installed the 32’ bombarde stop. This enhancement is dedicated to the memory of twelve former cathedral choristers who died on active service during the Great War. A notable feature of the west organ was the addition, also by SIOC, of a solo and horizontal fanfare trumpet, voiced in the French symphonic school. Named in honour of Geoffrey Gates AM, the fanfare trumpet was blessed at Evensong on 1 May 2011.

Chancel organ
In 1994 a new chancel organ was installed in the chamber under the bell tower. Consisting of 18 stops in 3 divisions, with mechanical key and electric stop action, this small organ is designed to accompany choirs singing in the chancel. Electric over-ride enables both the chancel organ and the west organ to be played simultaneously from a third and free-standing console.

Chamber organ
This instrument was built in 1987 and can be placed anywhere in the cathedral to serve as a continuo instrument. Its five ranks of pipes are enclosed in a swell box and played from a single manual. The organ has four speaking stops, no pedals and a transposer allowing it to be pitched at either standard pitch of A440 or at A415 for authentic performance of early music.

Ascalon
On 15 June 2009, after a 12-month submission and selection process, the chapter of St George's Cathedral commissioned Marcus Canning and Christian de Vietri to create a contemporary sculpture on the theme of St George and the Dragon for the cathedral grounds.

Named "Ascalon" after the lance used by St George to slay the dragon, the artwork aims “to evoke a sense of righteous power and victory over a force of darkness and oppression”.

The blessing of Ascalon took place on 3 April 2011.

Precinct
The Cadogan Song School was built between February 2016 and August 2017 and is located between the cathedral and the hall, and to the west of the deanery.  The building serves as a home to the St George's Cathedral Choir and Consort.

The 1917 Burt Memorial Hall was refurbished with upgraded facilities and a new roof between 2012 and 2014. The hall was reopened and rededicated at Evensong on 20 July 2014.

The 1859 deanery, which adjoins the cathedral on the corner of Pier Street, had external restoration work in 2010 and 2011 and a much needed upgrade on the internal fabric in 2017.  The deanery gardens were completed in October 2017 and is the final link to the Cathedral Precinct.

Deans
The following individuals have served as deans of Perth:

Gallery

See also

 Saint George in devotions, traditions and prayers
 Peter Carnley

References

Further reading
 Evenson, Lilian M. (1977) A short history and guide to Saint George's cathedral Perth: Cathedral Chapter. (Based on a guide book prepared in 1950).
 A History and Detailed Guide to St George's Cathedral, Revised 2007. Retrieved on 2009-03-03.

External links

St George's Cathedral website
The Organ Society of Western Australia website

Churches completed in 1888
19th-century Anglican church buildings
Anglican cathedrals in Australia
Perth
Gothic Revival architecture in Perth, Western Australia
Gothic Revival church buildings in Australia
Cathedral Square, Perth
Cathedrals in Western Australia
George, Perth
State Register of Heritage Places in the City of Perth